Lieutenant-General Sir Sydney Turing Barlow Lawford, KCB (16 November 186515 February 1953), was a decorated British general, later to become the father of Hollywood actor Peter Lawford.

Early life
Lawford was born on 16 November 1865 at Tunbridge Wells in the county of Kent in England, the son of Thomas Acland Lawford. He was educated at Windlesham House School from 1870 to 1878 and thereafter at Wellington College.

Military career
After receiving military training at Royal Military College, Sandhurst, he received a commission into the British Army as a lieutenant in the 7th Battalion, Royal Fusiliers (City of London Regiment) on 7 February 1885 and was promoted to captain on 3 September 1894.

He served in the Second Boer War in South Africa, commanding the 19th battalion of Mounted Infantry, and was promoted to major on 21 November 1900. Following the end of the war he received the brevet rank of lieutenant-colonel on 22 August 1902, before he returned home on the SS Briton the following month. He received his colonelcy in 1912 and became the commandant of the School of Mounted Infantry at Longmoor.

In World War I, Lawford commanded the 22nd (Infantry) Brigade on the Western Front in 1914–1915, before being promoted to the rank of Major-General and appointed to the command of the 41st Division, part of the junior division of the New Army from 1915 to 1919.

His military nickname was 'Swanky Syd', apparently derived from his habit of donning full dress regalia, including all of his medal entitlement, regularly. He was knighted in the field. Field Marshal Earl Douglas Haig noted in his personal diary in early 1915 the following assessment of Lawford as a General: "I was at Sandhurst with Lawford, ... although endowed with no great ability, he is hard fighting and plucky."

After the war Lawford received promotion to the rank of Lieutenant-General, and was posted to the British India Army. He retired in 1926.

Death
Lawford died on 15 February 1953.

Personal life
Lawford led a somewhat complicated private life. His first marriage was on 30 September 1893, at St. Paul's Church, Knightsbridge, London, to Lillian Maud Cass, who died on 26 November 1900. His second marriage was on 20 May 1914 in London to Muriel Williams. While serving in India in the early 1920s, and while still married to Muriel, he fell in love with the wife of one of his officers, May Somerville Aylen (4 November 188323 January 1972), and she became pregnant with his child. Colonel Ernest Aylen, May's husband, upon hearing this news, divorced her over the scandal. General Lawford and Muriel divorced. He then married May Aylen, and their child, the actor Peter Lawford, was born in 1923, when his father was 58 years of age. The Lawfords returned to England. But the scandal eventually drove the family to settle in France, and they then moved to the United States in the late 1930s.

References

1865 births
1953 deaths
British Army personnel of the Second Boer War
British Army generals of World War I
People from Royal Tunbridge Wells
Knights Commander of the Order of the Bath
Royal Fusiliers officers
British expatriates in France
British expatriates in the United States
People educated at Windlesham House School
People educated at Wellington College, Berkshire
Military personnel from Kent
British Army lieutenant generals